Castle Leazes is a piece of common land in Newcastle upon Tyne. It is situated in an area which separates Leazes Park and Spital Tongues. It has been in common ownership for over 700 years.

This area of land was earmarked as the site of a new stadium by Newcastle United football club in the mid-1990s, when chairman John Hall announced his intention to build a 55,000 seater stadium was planned at a potential cost of £65 million. The planned move proved controversial with the club's supporters and others, and was shelved in favour of expanding St James' Park to over 50,000 seats over the next few years.

Castle Leazes Halls 
The Castle Leazes Halls are Newcastle University's second largest Catered Halls of Residence, with approximately 1,050 student study bedrooms.

References 

Parks and open spaces in Newcastle upon Tyne
Castle Leazes Halls